An apple corer is a device for removing the core and pips from an apple. It may also be used for similar fruits, such as pears or quince.

Some apple corers consist of a handle with a circular cutting device at the end. When pushed through the apple, it removes the core to the diameter of the circular cutting device. The core can then be removed from the apple corer.

Another type of apple corer can be placed on top of the apple and pushed through, which both cores and slices the apple. This is also often called apple cutter or apple slicer.

An apple corer is often used when the apple needs to be kept whole, for example, when making baked apples, or when a large number of apples need to be cored and sliced, for example, when making an apple pie or similar dessert.

See also

 Pineapple cutter

References

Food preparation utensils
Domestic implements